Royal Oak High School (ROHS) is a public high school located in Royal Oak, Michigan. The current principal is Sharida Lewis. It is a part of Royal Oak Neighborhood Schools.

History
ROHS is a 2006 consolidation of former intra-city rivals Royal Oak George A. Dondero High School and
Royal Oak Clarence M. Kimball High School.

This educational facility draws its name from the original Royal Oak High School (later Clara Barton Junior High), which opened in 1914, and its successor, the "new" Royal Oak High School, which opened in 1927. After the opening of a second high school facility within the Royal Oak school system in 1957, the then "Royal Oak High School" changed its name to "George A. Dondero High School". Its counterpart was named "Clarence M. Kimball High School".

At their peak, both institutions had an enrollment of over 2,000 students. But declining enrollment throughout the district forced the closure of Dondero High School in 2006, and the student populations of the two schools were merged into one facility. Kimball High School became the site of the newly merged school.  Extensive renovations were made to accommodate the surge of students, after which the high school was renamed Royal Oak High School.

In 2009, Detroit rapper Eminem shot his short film "Where Have You Been?" in the halls and on the grounds of Royal Oak High School.

On October 12, 2010, Royal Oak High School was featured on the MTV show If You Really Knew Me.  The episode was the season 1 finale, and documents "Challenge Day" at Royal Oak High School.

The high school had an average score of 98.6 on the state's MEAP test in 2011 and a very high number of AP students.

School media
There have been two student news publications at Royal Oak High School: The Herald and The Acorn.

The Herald, which originated from Kimball High School ("Knights"), featured school-centered news and updates. The Herald was discontinued due to lack of funding, leaving The Acorn as the sole news source for the school since 2011. The Acorn is a news magazine - originally from Dondero High School's "Oaks" publication - that reports on more widespread affairs to increase student global awareness. The Acorn is a recipient of Michigan Interscholastic Press Association (MIPA) awards.

Noesis is the student creative arts magazine, providing a forum for student artists to publish their work.
Royal Oak High School's PTSA publishes a bimonthly bulletin called "The Raven's Call".

Royal Oak High School also has a media class that broadcasts on public access, WOAK, and on the school closed-circuit feed.  School announcements and short student videos are featured on a student news program titled "The Raven Report", and broadcast to all classrooms over the Internet.  In May 2012, the Advanced TV/Video production class was the grand prize winner of the national Drive One 4UR Schools video contest put on by Ford Motor Company.

Notable alumni

Clarence M. Kimball High School (prior to consolidation)
 Debra Evans - writer
 Margo Jonker - softball coach
 Chris Gore - writer
 Mona Hanna-Attisha - pediatrician, public health advocate and Flint Water Crisis whistleblower

George A. Dondero High School (prior to consolidation)
 Glenn Frey - founder and musician of The Eagles rock band.
 Judith Guest - author of Ordinary People.
 Tom Hayden - Anti-Vietnam War activist, author and California state legislator.

Royal Oak High School
 Jake Ryan - Comedian.

References

External links
Royal Oak High School

Educational institutions established in 2006
Public high schools in Michigan
Schools in Royal Oak, Michigan
High schools in Oakland County, Michigan
2006 establishments in Michigan